Calocephalus sonderi (common name pale beauty-heads) is a plant in the family Asteraceae, found in South Australia, Victoria,  Queensland and New South Wales.

It was first described by Ferdinand von Mueller in 1859. The specific epithet, sonderi, honours the German botanist Otto Wilhelm Sonder.

Description
Calocephalus sonderi is an annual, erect  herb, growing from  10 cm to 50 cm high and is  woolly, and grey to silvery in colour. The leaves  are mostly alternate and from 2–3 cm long by 1 mm to 2 mm wide. The  upper leaves smaller and have non-hairy appendage at their apices. It flowers from spring to summer and is found in grasslands and open woodlands. It is widespread in inland New South Wales.

References

External links
Calocephalus sonderi: Occurrence data from the Australasian Virtual Herbarium
Calocephalus sonderi Lucid Central (images & description)

Gnaphalieae
Plants described in 1859
Flora of Australia
Taxa named by Ferdinand von Mueller